Morris S. Barnett (1808 – April 30, 1902) was an American politician.

Barnett owned a sawmill in Eldorado, Wisconsin in the 1840s. United States Senator Philetus Sawyer worked for Barnett at the sawmill. He was active in the anti-slavery movement in Wisconsin. He lived in Milwaukee, Wisconsin and served on the Milwaukee County Board of Supervisors. Barnett then moved to Fond du Lac, Wisconsin. In 1851 and 1857, Barnett served in the Wisconsin Assembly while living in Fond du Lac. Barnett was a member of the Whig and Free Soil Party. Barnett later supported the Republican Party. Barlett died from pneumonia at his son's home in Neenah, Wisconsin.

Notes

External links

1808 births
1902 deaths
Politicians from Fond du Lac, Wisconsin
Businesspeople from Wisconsin
Wisconsin Free Soilers
Wisconsin Whigs
County supervisors in Wisconsin
19th-century American businesspeople
Republican Party members of the Wisconsin State Assembly